Luis Miguel Ribeiro Teixeira (born 9 March 1990 in Amarante) known as Miguelito, is a Portuguese professional footballer who plays for Nea Salamina as a midfielder.

Club career
On 21 August 2017, Miguelito made his professional debut with Olympiakos Nicosia in a 2017–18 Cypriot First Division match against Doxa.

In the summer of 2019, Miguelito returned to Cyprus to join first division side Ethnikos Achna. In his league debut against Paralimi on 26 August, Miguelito scored twice to help his side to a 4–3 win.

References

External links

1990 births
Living people
People from Amarante, Portugal
Portuguese footballers
Association football midfielders
Campeonato de Portugal (league) players
Cypriot First Division players
Amarante F.C. players
Olympiakos Nicosia players
Ethnikos Achna FC players
Nea Salamis Famagusta FC players
Portuguese expatriate footballers
Expatriate footballers in Cyprus
Portuguese expatriate sportspeople in Cyprus
Sportspeople from Porto District